Hambrecht & Quist (H&Q) was an investment bank based in San Francisco, California noted for its focus on the technology and Internet sectors.  H&Q was founded by Bill Hambrecht and George Quist in California, in 1968. 

H&Q was an early player in the technology sector, underwriting initial public offerings (IPOs) for Apple Computer, Genentech, and Adobe Systems in the 1980s.  In the 1990s, H&Q also backed the IPOs of Netscape, MP3.com, and Amazon.com.

Competition in the investment banking industry in the late 1990s limited H&Q's ability to grow as an independent firm, and in 1999, Hambrecht & Quist was acquired for $1.35 billion by Chase Manhattan Bank. H&Q was originally to be renamed "Chase Securities West" but ultimately was renamed "Chase H&Q" after marketing research revealed the H&Q brand name was still valuable. This unit eventually lost the H&Q name and became part of JPMorgan Chase. The H&Q name lives on in the closed-end healthcare funds managed by Hambrecht & Quist Capital Management in Boston.

After leaving H&Q, founder Hambrecht popularized the "OpenIPO" model, in which Dutch auctions allowed anyone, not just investing insiders, to buy stock in an IPO, potentially raising more money for startups. Among the companies that adopted this model were Overstock.com, Ravenswood Winery, and Salon Media Group.

See also
WR Hambrecht + Co, an investment bank founded by William Hambrecht after acquisition of H&Q
H&Q Asia Pacific, a private equity firm focused on Asian markets

References

Further reading 

Chase Agrees to Acquire Hambrecht & Quist.  The New York Times, September 29, 1999
Culture shock -- J.P. Morgan jolts Hambrecht & Quist.  San Francisco Business Times, March 16, 2001

JPMorgan Chase
Former investment banks of the United States
American companies established in 1968
Banks established in 1968
Financial services companies established in 1968
Companies based in San Francisco
1968 establishments in California